Apoptosis regulatory protein Siva is a protein that in humans is encoded by the SIVA1 gene.
This gene encodes a protein with an important role in the apoptotic (programmed cell death) pathway induced by the CD27 antigen, a member of the tumor necrosis factor receptor (TFNR) superfamily. The CD27 antigen cytoplasmic tail binds to the N-terminus of this protein. Two alternatively spliced transcript variants encoding distinct proteins have been described.

Interactions
SIVA1 has been shown to interact with CD27.

Siva (protein) 
Siva protein is a zinc-containing intracellular ligand of the CD4 receptor that promotes HIV-1 envelope-induced apoptosis in T-lymphoid cells. Recent research has demonstrated that Siva is  a direct transcriptional target for the tumor-suppressors p53 and E2F1.

See also
 Siva (protein)

References

Further reading